The HESA Fotros ( fʊtros) is an Iranian reconnaissance, surveillance, and combat unmanned aerial vehicle built by Iran Aircraft Manufacturing Industries Corporation and unveiled in November 2013. It was the largest Iranian drone at its unveiling. It has an operational range of 1,700 km to 2,000 km  with flight endurance of 16 to 30 hours depending on armament. The name refers to a fallen angel in Shia mythology which was redeemed by Imam Husayn ibn Ali. The Fotros carries up to six missiles or bombs.

History 
It is believed that the Fotros was rushed into a finished state to be unveiled before the start of P5+1 talks over Iran's nuclear programs. It carries at least 6 Ghaem  Precision-guided munitions, or 6 of 3 unnamed Precision-guided munitions.

In 2020 the UAV participated in a military training drill known as “Defenders of Velayat Skies.”

Status 
There was no news or status updates on the Fotros between its announcement in 2013 and 2020.

In 2020 it was announced that the drone had entered service and more images surfaced of the UAV. Production is believed to have started, and at least 2 have been produced.

Specifications

See also

References

 

 

Unmanned military aircraft of Iran
Iranian military aircraft
Aircraft manufactured in Iran
Islamic Republic of Iran Air Force
Post–Cold War military equipment of Iran
Unmanned aerial vehicles of Iran